Sarah T. – Portrait of a Teenage Alcoholic is a 1975 American psychological drama television film directed by Richard Donner and written by Richard and Esther Shapiro. The film stars Linda Blair as the title character. It also stars Larry Hagman, Verna Bloom, and William Daniels.

Plot
Sarah Travis is a 15-year-old girl dealing with feelings of isolation and inadequacy. Her parents are divorced and she has minimal contact with her unemployed, alcoholic father, Jerry. Sarah lives with her mother JoAnne, and stepfather Matt, neither of whom notice how lonely Sarah is. She feels overshadowed by her sister, Nancy, and wishes to live with her father.

Sarah begins drinking alcohol at her mother's party after becoming uncomfortable with personal questions from the guests. She soon associates happiness with drinking and surprises herself by singing, which everyone at the party appreciates. When Sarah becomes inebriated at the party, her parents wrongly blame her teenage friend, Ken. JoAnne is more concerned with what others think than the welfare of her daughter.

Ken invites Sarah to join him riding his horse Daisy, and Sarah becomes more popular at school. However, her home life continues to be confusing and erratic. JoAnne decides to fire their housekeeper Margaret for raiding the liquor cabinet, but it was actually Sarah who was watering down the scotch after taking illicit drinks.

Sarah starts drinking at school, misses classes and forges notes from her mother. The school counselor tells JoAnne that something is wrong in Sarah's life. The counselor characterizes Sarah as a student with a high I.Q. who once took a diligent approach to her schoolwork. JoAnne resents the counselor's interventions and feels that she is being targeted because of the divorce.

Sarah confesses to Ken that she drinks to make things easier. After Sarah is unable to contact her father by telephone, Sarah passes out from drinking, even though she is babysitting. In a confrontation with Matt and JoAnne, Sarah states that she has been drinking almost daily for two years.

A doctor's visit fails to convince JoAnne that Sarah has a problem. Sarah attends an Alcoholics Anonymous meeting where she meets Bobby, who is even younger than Sarah. What Bobby tells the group resonates with Sarah, and she recognizes herself in what Bobby says, such as the constant lying.

During her family therapy sessions, Sarah expresses a desire for her family to be complete once again and for her parents to stop fighting. When Jerry reveals that he is unable to have full custody of Sarah because of the nature of his job, Sarah once again feels the irresistible urge to drink. She asks a group of rough-looking teenagers to purchase vodka for her, inviting them to do anything to her. They tease her by drinking most of the bottle themselves. After drinking the remaining vodka, she takes Daisy for a ride. Though Ken tries to stop Sarah, she rides the horse into oncoming traffic on a busy street. As a result, Daisy is mortally wounded in an automobile accident, and the police shoot Daisy.

Sarah spends time in a hospital, where she expresses remorse for the way she has acted. She realizes how much she has loved her family and her friends at the Alcoholics Anonymous meeting, and admits that she is an alcoholic.

Cast
 Linda Blair as Sarah Travis
 Larry Hagman as Jerry Travis
 Verna Bloom as Jean Hodges
 William Daniels as Matt Hodges
 Michael Lerner as Dr. Marvin Kittredge
 Mark Hamill as Ken Newkirk
 Eric Olson as Bobby
 Laurette Spang as Nancy
 M. Emmet Walsh as Mr. Peterson
 Steve Benedict as Ray Peterson
 Richard Roat as Fred Tyler
 Marian Collier as Mrs. Peterson
 Hilda Haynes as Margaret
 Jessica Rains as Mrs. Tyler
 Sheila Larken as Vice Principal

Release
Sarah T. – Portrait of a Teenage Alcoholic premiered on NBC on February 11, 1975.

References

External links
 

1975 films
1975 drama films
1975 television films
1970s English-language films
1970s psychological drama films
1970s teen drama films
American psychological drama films
American teen drama films
American drama television films
Films about alcoholism
Films directed by Richard Donner
NBC network original films
NBC Productions films
1970s American films